Introducing Roland Kirk is the second album by the jazz multi-instrumentalist Roland Kirk, released on the Argo label in 1960. It features performances by Kirk with Ira Sullivan, William Burton, Donald Garrett and Sonny Brown.

Critical reception
The AllMusic review by Lindsay Planer states: "Although Kirk's performances are exceedingly reserved on this album, there is little doubt of his technical proficiencies. The three sides penned by Kirk are among the most interesting as they allow for a certain degree of openness that is essential when spotlighting his unique talents... Although some free jazz and avant-garde purists may find Introducing Roland Kirk not challenging enough, it provides a solid basis for his increasingly bombastic post-bop experiments throughout the remainder of the '60s and '70s".

Track listing
All compositions by Roland Kirk except as indicated.
"The Call" - 8:42
"Soul Station" - 5:57
"Our Waltz" (David Rose) - 4:51 
"Our Love Is Here To Stay" (George Gershwin, Ira Gershwin) - 4:50
"Spirit Girl" - 5:33
"Jack the Ripper" (William Burton) - 7:32
Recorded in Chicago, IL, June 7, 1960

Personnel
Roland Kirk: tenor saxophone, manzello, whistle, stritch
Ira Sullivan: trumpet, tenor saxophone
William Burton: organ, piano
Donald Garrett: bass
Sonny Brown: drums

References

1960 albums
Argo Records albums
Rahsaan Roland Kirk albums